Larry Maceo Moore (born June 1, 1975) is a former American football player in the National Football League.   Moore was a two-year starter at Brigham Young University earning first-team All-WAC honors as a junior and senior. In 1997, he spent time with the Washington Redskins and the Seattle Seahawks. He then played for the Indianapolis Colts before returning to the Redskins. He became Washington's starting center in 2002 in all 16 games, replacing Cory Raymer. But in 2003, he started only 8 of 16 games. Then he 2004 he lost his starting job to the man he previously replaced, Cory Raymer. Moore is currently the offensive line coach at the University of the Incarnate Word in San Antonio, Texas.

Education
High School – Monte Vista High School (Spring Valley, CA)
Community College – Grossmont College (El Cajon, CA)
University – Brigham Young University

1975 births
Living people
American football offensive linemen
Cincinnati Bengals players
Washington Redskins players
Indianapolis Colts players
Seattle Seahawks players
Grossmont Griffins football players
BYU Cougars football players
Players of American football from San Diego